The Antaryamin, in terms of Hindu philosophy, is related to the "inner-self", the "inner-controller" or the "inner-guidance" that exists in a person and itself manifests on an intuitive way to the one manifesting it. It recalls a teacher or a guru that resides within and once it is manifested - for a higher context of knowledge guidance - usually after one summons or prays for it, the Antaryamin comes to help. In some cases, the Antaryamin is asked to be manifested in order to resolve non-intellectual issues, also performing miracles to the one asking.

Hindu contextualization

On the Hindu scriptures, we find the concept of the Antaryamin as the Inner Controller  after the building of the elementary concepts regarding a deity or an ego - on a unity way - of which is controlling, somehow to a compared intelligence, the universe and all that is. This intelligence may also refer to what is called consciousness or awareness that is far superior, hence capable of doing superior things.

References 

 Subrahmanian 
 Swami Krishnananda "THE NATURE OF THE INNER CONTROLLER"

External links 

Bhagavad Gita Chapter 13th 
Antarjami or Antaryamin? 

Hindu philosophical concepts